Lonicera pileata, known as box-leaved honeysuckle or privet honeysuckle, is a species of honeysuckle native to central and southwestern China, and is a garden plant elsewhere.

It is a low, ground-covering shrub growing to 1 m tall. The leaves are small, 1–3 cm long, glossy, and evergreen in mild winters. The flowers are white, tubular, and borne in spring, followed by purple berries.

References

pileata
Flora of China